The Addo Elephant Trail Run is a 25-, 50- and 100-mile event that takes place in and around the Addo Elephant National Park which is situated  north of the South African coastal city of Port Elizabeth.

The trail consists mainly of tracks within the national park itself, with some stretches on gravel roads. Due to the remoteness and inaccessibility of the trail, the Addo Elephant Trail Runs differ substantially from other organized runs. Adequate mental and physical preparation is of utmost importance to each runner, because the mountains and valleys, although beautiful, are relentless in their challenge and unforgiving to the ill prepared.

The 25- and 50-mile distances start near Kirkwood, and winds its way through valleys and over the Zuurberg Mountains to finish at the Addo Elephant Park Main Rest Camp. The 100-mile distance starts at the Addo Elephant Park Main Rest Camp and finishes at the Zuurberg Lodge.

Results

See also
Kalahari Augrabies Extreme Marathon
Rhodes Trail Run

References

External links
Official Site

Long-distance running competitions
Athletics competitions in South Africa